Rick Spencer  (born October 21, 1952)  Ft. Huachuca, Arizona is an American folk singer-songwriter  and musical historian.  He grew up in Newtown, Connecticut and graduated from  Western Connecticut State University in 1975.

Associated acts 
Spencer was a founding member of Forebitter with whom he toured extensively and recorded five albums.  
He is a current member of the Jovial Crew, and the trio, LongSplice, with Joseph Morneault and Dawn Indermuehle.
Spencer worked with Stan Hugill delving into the history of sea music and singing sea shanties.
He worked for 20 years as a staff musician, interpreter, researcher and program developer at Mystic Seaport Museum.   Spencer is recognized internationally, as an authority on the history and presentation of English language maritime music.

He has been on stage with Pete Seeger, Oscar Brand, Paul Winter, John Roberts, Jerry Bryant, and many others.

References

1952 births
Living people
American acoustic guitarists
American male guitarists
American folk guitarists
American folk singers
American male singer-songwriters
American banjoists
People from Fort Huachuca, Arizona
People from Newtown, Connecticut
20th-century American guitarists
20th-century American male musicians
Singer-songwriters from Arizona
Singer-songwriters from Connecticut